Night of the Living Dead 3D: Re-Animation is a 2012 horror film prequel to the 2006 film,  Night of the Living Dead 3D. It stars Andrew Divoff, who also served as co-producer, Jeffrey Combs, Sarah Lieving and Denice Duff.

Plot
Pyrophobic mortician Gerald Tovar, Jr. inherits the family mortuary and accidentally exposes hundreds of uncremated bodies to toxic medical waste. As the corpses reanimate, Gerald’s inheritance-seeking younger brother, Harold, unexpectedly shows up and stumbles upon Gerald trying to keep the zombie outbreak under control. Sibling rivalry gives way to madness as Harold discovers Gerald’s dark secret–the freshly exhumed and zombified corpse of their father. The film also features a Sarah Palin spoof in the character of 'Sister Sara' (who works for a news outlet called 'Fixed News' which is apparently a spoof of Fox News) and makes references to the original 1968 Night of the Living Dead film with comments such as "They're Romero zombies" and "Pittsburgh is the zombie capital."

Cast
 Andrew Divoff as Gerald Tovar Jr.
 Max Taylor as Young Gerald Tovar Jr.
 Jeffrey Combs as Harold Tovar
 Sarah Lieving as Cristie Forrest
 Robin Sydney as DyeAnne
 Adam Chambers as Russell
 Scott Thomson as Werner Gottshok
 Melissa Jo Bailey as Aunt Lou
 Rhonda Aldrich as Honey Del Amo
 Mark Sikes as Francis Del Amo
 Andra Kokott as Mrs. Block
 Ray Zone as Peter Block
 Kyle Morris as Eric Hadley
 Luis Accinelli as Gerald Tovar Sr. Zombie
 Dennis Hayden as Tall Zombie
 Brittani McNeal as Goth Zombie
 Denice Duff as Sister Sara

References

External links

2012 films
2012 horror films
American zombie films
Direct-to-video prequel films
2010s English-language films
2010s American films
American prequel films